Svetlana Kuznetsova (née Vasilieva; born 15 July 1995) is a Russian former racing cyclist. She rode in the women's road race event at the 2017 UCI Road World Championships.

Major results

2013
 2nd  Team pursuit, UCI Juniors Track World Championships
 2nd  Team pursuit, UEC European Junior Track Championships
2015
 1st  Overall Tour of Adygeya
1st  Points classification
1st Stage 1
 Military World Games
2nd  Team road race
3rd  Time trial
 2nd Grand Prix of Maykop
 8th Overall Tour de Feminin-O cenu Českého Švýcarska
 9th Overall Tour de Bretagne Féminin
2016
 3rd Time trial, National Road Championships
 10th Overall Tour de Feminin-O cenu Českého Švýcarska
 10th Grand Prix de Plumelec-Morbihan Dames
2017
 3rd Road race, National Road Championships

References

External links

1995 births
Living people
Russian female cyclists
Sportspeople from Tatarstan